The 5th Session of the 11th National People's Congress held its annual meeting in March 2012 at the Great Hall of the People in Beijing, China. The event opened on 5 March and concluded on 14 March. Premier Wen Jiabao delivered his work report as Premier.

Government work report 
Premier Wen delivered the central government's work report on 5 March, stating GDP growth would be at 7.5 percent. This was slower than the 8 to 10 percent of preceding years and decades. The government was targeting inflation to be around 4 percent. Wen also indicated about 9 million new jobs would be created in towns and cities. The official urban unemployment rate was expected to be 4.6 percent or lower.  He mentioned China's volume of total exports and imports had been projected to be about 10 percent. The central government would need to make further reforms in industrial restructuring, innovation, energy conservation, and emissions reduction, and real income increases for the people that are in line with economic growth.

The work report reflected the growing challenges of managing growth and subduing inflation while the Communist Party mapped out a leadership transition and at the same time maintaining high employment and a high emphasis on safeguarding stability.

Premier Wen's press conference
In that year's National People's Congress convention, there were intense domestic and international media interest on Premier Wen and his views as this was his last year in office, home stretch to retirement. The media also wanted to hear Premier Wen's assessment of his term in office, insights to the challenges to the future, and the legacy he would be leaving behind.

In the premier's last official press conference for his work report, he emphasized China required further economic and political reforms to keep the gains from over the years and keep on improving people's livelihoods. Wen alluded to the Cultural Revolution which was a travesty for the Chinese people and political reforms should still continue. He reflected there was a lot of unfinished business and regrets in his nine-year stint as premier. Wen was apologetic for the social and economic problems over the last decade and conceded there was room for improvements and took responsibility for it.

Wen also reiterated poignantly the investigation into the Wang Lijun incident in Chongqing had yielded significant progress and local authorities should ponder and learn from the incident. On 15 March 2012, Bo Xilai, the Chongqing party chief, had been replaced.

The premier stressed the new leadership will need to press on with political structural reform which are necessary to implement successful structural economic reforms.

References

External links
NPC Official Website

2012 in China
National People's Congresses